A timer is a specialized type of clock used for measuring specific time intervals. 
Timers can be categorized into two main types. 
The word "timer" is usually reserved for devices that counts down from a specified time interval, while devices that do the opposite, measuring elapsed time by counting upwards from zero, are called stopwatches.  A simple example of the first type is an hourglass. Working method timers have two main groups: hardware and software timers.

Most timers give an indication that the time interval that had been set has expired.

Time switches, timing mechanisms that activate a switch, are sometimes also called "timers".

Hardware

Mechanical
Mechanical use clockwork to measure time. Manual timers are typically set by turning a dial to the time interval desired; turning the dial stores energy in a mainspring to run the mechanism. They function similarly to a mechanical alarm clock; the energy in the mainspring causes a balance wheel to rotate back and forth. Each swing of the wheel releases the gear train to move forward by a small fixed amount, causing the dial to move steadily backward until it reaches zero when a lever arm strikes a bell. The mechanical kitchen timer was invented in 1926 called a fan fly that spins against air resistance; low-precision mechanical egg-timers are sometimes of this type.

The simplest and oldest type of mechanical timer is the hourglass - which is also known as "the glass of the hour" - in which a fixed amount of sand drains through a narrow opening from one chamber to another to measure a time interval.

Electromechanical

Short-period bimetallic electromechanical timers use a thermal mechanism, with a metal finger made of strips of two metals with different rates of thermal expansion sandwiched together; steel and bronze are common. An electric current flowing through this finger causes heating of the metals, one side expands less than the other, and an electrical contact on the end of the finger moves away from or towards an electrical switch contact. The most common use of this type is in the "flasher" units that flash turn signals in automobiles, and sometimes in Christmas lights. This is a non-electronic type of multivibrator.

An electromechanical cam timer uses a small synchronous AC motor turning a cam against a comb of switch contacts. The AC motor is turned at an accurate rate by the alternating current, which power companies carefully regulate. Gears drive a shaft at the desired rate, and turn the cam. The most common application of this timer now is in washers, driers and dishwashers. This type of timer often has a friction clutch between the gear train and the cam, so that the cam can be turned to reset the time.

Electromechanical timers survive in these applications because mechanical switch contacts may still be less expensive than the semiconductor devices needed to control powerful lights, motors and heaters.

In the past, these electromechanical timers were often combined with electrical relays to create electro-mechanical controllers. Electromechanical timers reached a high state of development in the 1950s and 1960s because of their extensive use in aerospace and weapons systems. Programmable electromechanical timers controlled launch sequence events in early rockets and ballistic missiles. As digital electronics has progressed and dropped in price, electronic timers have become more advantageous.

Electronic

Electronic timers are essentially quartz clocks with special electronics, and can achieve higher precision than mechanical timers. Electronic timers have digital electronics, but may have an analog or digital display. Integrated circuits have made digital logic so inexpensive that an electronic timer is now less expensive than many mechanical and electromechanical timers. Individual timers are implemented as a simple single-chip computer system, similar to a watch and usually using the same, mass-produced, technology.

Many timers are now implemented in software. Modern controllers use a programmable logic controller (PLC) rather than a box full of electromechanical parts. The logic is usually designed as if it were relays, using a special computer language called ladder logic. In PLCs, timers are usually simulated by the software built into the controller. Each timer is just an entry in a table maintained by the software.

Computer systems usually have at least one hardware timer. These are typically digital counters that either increment or decrement at a fixed frequency, which is often configurable, and which interrupt the processor when reaching zero. An alternative design uses a counter with a sufficiently large word size that it will not reach its overflow limit before the end of life of the system.

More sophisticated timers may have comparison logic to compare the timer value against a specific value, set by software, that triggers some action when the timer value matches the preset value. This might be used, for example, to measure events or generate pulse-width modulated waveforms to control the speed of motors (using a class D digital electronic amplifier).

One specialist use of hardware timers in computer systems is as watchdog timers, which are designed to perform a hardware reset of the system if the software fails.

Software
These types of timers are not devices nor parts of devices; they exist only as software. They rely on the accuracy of a clock generator usually built into a hardware device that runs the software.

Applications
Due to the increasing popularity of mobile phones, many  timer apps have been developed that mimic the old mechanical timer, but which have also highly sophisticated functions. These apps are also easier to use, because they are available at once, without any need to purchase or carry separate devices. Timers can be software applications phones, smartwatches, or tablets. Some of these apps are countdown timers, stopwatch timers, etc. These timer apps can be used for tracking working or training time, motivating children to do tasks, replacing an hourglass-form egg timer in board games such as Boggle, or for the traditional purpose of tracking time when cooking.

Apps may be superior to hour glasses, or to mechanical timers. Hour glasses are not precise and clear, and they can jam. Mechanical timers lack the customization that applications support, such as sound volume adjustments for individual needs. Most applications will also offer selectable alarm sounds.

Some timer applications can help children to understand the concept of time, help them to finish tasks in time, and help them to get motivated. These applications are especially used with children with disabilities like ADHD, Down syndrome, etc., but everybody else can also benefit from them.

See also

Candle-timers
Countdown
Time lock
Drip irrigation
Egg timer
Intervalometer
Staircase timer
Time to digital converter
Water clock

References

Digital circuits
Control devices
Home automation
Timers